The Iron Lion of Cangzhou , also known as the "Sea Guard Howler", is a cast iron  sculpture located in Cangzhou City, in Hebei Province, China, about 180 km (110 mi) southwest of Beijing. Cast in the Later Zhou dynasty in 953, the iron lion is the largest known and oldest surviving iron-cast artwork in China. It is considered one of the Four Treasures of Hebei.

Description

The Iron Lion of Cangzhou is 5.78 m (19 ft) high, 6.5 m (21 ft 4 in) long, 3.17 m (10 ft 5 in) wide, and has an estimated weight of 40 tonnes  (44 tons). According to Donald B. Wagner, it is 5.4 m high, 5.35 m long, 3 m wide, and weighs 50  tonnes. On its back, it carries a basin-shaped lotus throne with a maximum diameter of about 2 m (6 ft 7 in) and a height of 70 cm (28 in). Presumably, the iron lion was originally displayed inside a Buddhist temple and carried a bronze statue of the bodhisattva Manjusri on the lotus seat. The bronze statue was later removed, maybe because of the higher value of the bronze.

The iron lion is a cultural icon in Cangzhou, the city is referred to as the "Lion City" and a local beer (Cangzhou Lion Beer) is named after the sculpture.

Casting
The iron lion was cast using a piece-moulding technique in a single mould. In this technique, which has also been used in ancient Chinese bronze-casting, a clay model of the sculpture is made and covered with a new layer of clay after drying. This outer layer of clay is then cut into pieces and removed before it dries completely. In the next step, material is taken off the surface of the inner clay model in order to provide room for pouring the iron between the outer and inner mould. Hence, "seams" visible on the cast do not represent boundaries between separate iron pieces, but are impressions of the seams between the pieces of the outer mould. Casting did proceed in several stages between which the iron already poured into the mould did cool down. As a result, fault lines were introduced into the cast at regular intervals which mark the filling height of the mould at successive casting stages. These fault lines were bridged by the craftsmen carrying out the cast with pieces of wrought iron which were plunged into the solidifying surface of the iron from the previous pour and then covered in the next pour. Traces of these bridging pegs as well as those of wrought iron spacers used to separate the outer mould from the core can still be found in the sculpture.

Conservation
Over the years, the iron lion sculpture has sustained various kinds of damage: By 1603, its tail had been lost. In 1803, a storm toppled the statue resulting in damage to its snout and belly. In 1886, it was supported with stones and bricks on the orders of a local magistrate. In 1961, it was listed as a national key cultural relic. In 1984, the iron lion was remounted on a stone pedestal. Its legs were filled with a sulfate compound. Probably due to these interventions, cracks began to appear in the sculpture. Therefore, most of the compound was removed during restoration work carried out in 2000.

Notes

References

External links

Wagner, D.B. "The cast iron lion of Cangzhou" . Needham Research Institute newsletter, no. 10. June 1991. pp. 2–3.
Du, M. "1,000-Year-Old Iron Lion to be Saved". People's Daily. November 1, 2001.
Mitchell, Dr DS  information on manufacture and video.

Outdoor sculptures in China
Major National Historical and Cultural Sites in Hebei
10th-century sculptures
Sculptures of lions
953
10th-century establishments in China
Cast-iron sculptures